Terren Scott Peizer, is an investor and company executive. He is the CEO of Acuitas Group Holdings and Neurmedix. He is also the CEO and chairman of Ontrak. He has held senior executive positions within technology and biotech companies, at Goldman Sachs and First Boston, and as a bond salesman at Drexel Burnham Lambert.

Early life and education 
Peizer's hometown is Beachwood, Ohio. He attended Beachwood High School. Peizer graduated from the Wharton School of the University of Pennsylvania.

Career 
In 1983, Peizer worked at Goldman Sachs and later worked at First Boston as a salesman. Michael Milken hired Peizer as a bond salesman at Drexel Burnham Lambert in 1985. He was the manager of David M. Solomon's account with Drexel and given a 3.5 million dollar salary and a $500.000 loan to invest in the partnership. Peizer worked directly under (and at the same desk as) Milken and admired him, sometimes pretending to be him on the phone, and calling him "Dad". When investigations into Milken's illegal activities started, Peizer agreed to provide material evidence to prosecutors in exchange for immunity.

In 1989 Peizer purchased the Omaha Racers, a minor league basketball team. In 1991 he bought UTI Chemicals Inc. through his company Financial Group Holdings Inc. and stepped down as its chairman in 1994.

In 1993 he was elected Chairman at CMS Enhancements after acquiring a 36.8% share of the company. From 1997 to 1999, Peizer was president of Hollis-Eden, a pharmaceutical company. In 1999 Peizer raised money for Tera Computer Company, a manufacturer of supercomputers, which allowed them to later buy out Cray Research and became its chairman and a director. He stepped back down as chairman in 2000 because the company was concerned that he would not obtain a security clearance from the United States Department of Defense by the end of 2000 to transfer Cray's classified business from Silicon Graphics, causing Cray Research to pay a penalty fee to Silicon Graphics.

Peizer founded Hythiam Inc., a pharmaceutical company, in 2004. The firm bought the rights to Juan Jose Legarda's addiction treatment pharmaceuticals. 60 Minutes and The Dallas Morning News criticized Peizer after the company bypassed clinical studies and government approval when bringing Prometa to market.

In 2018, Peizer became CEO and director of BioVie, a pharmaceutical company.

On March 1, 2023, Peizer was charged with insider trading by the SEC.

References 

American investment bankers
Drexel Burnham Lambert
Goldman Sachs people
HIV/AIDS researchers
Living people
People from Beachwood, Ohio
1959 births